Anastathes parallela is a species of beetle in the family Cerambycidae. It was described by Breuning in 1956. It is known from China.

References

Astathini
Beetles described in 1956
Beetles of Asia